The 2018 SBS Entertainment Awards presented by Seoul Broadcasting System (SBS), took place on December 28, 2018 at SBS Prism Tower in Sangam-dong, Mapo-gu, Seoul. It was hosted by Park Soo-hong, Han Go-eun and Kim Jong-kook. The nominees were chosen from SBS variety, talk and comedy shows that aired from December 2017 to November 2018.

Nominations and winners

Presenters

Special performances

References

External links 
 

Seoul Broadcasting System original programming
SBS Entertainment Awards
2018 television awards
2018 in South Korea